"Smooth Operator" is the lead single released from Big Daddy Kane's second album, It's a Big Daddy Thing. Arguably one of Big Daddy Kane's most popular songs, the song topped the newly formed Billboard Hot Rap Singles chart and was a hit on the  R&B and dance charts, peaking at number 11 and 17 on the charts respectively. Actor and comedian Chris Rock appears in the music video getting his hair cut. He appears 2 minutes, and 23 seconds into the video.

Samples
The song contains samples of "All Night Long" by Mary Jane Girls, "Do Your Thing" by Isaac Hayes from his soundtrack to the film Shaft (1971), "Sexual Healing" and "Let's Get It On" by Marvin Gaye, "The Champ" by The Mohawks, and "Impeach the President" by the Honey Drippers.

Single track listing

A-Side
"Smooth Operator" – 4:42
"Smooth Operator" (Instrumental) – 4:40

B-Side
"Warm It Up, Kane" – 4:12
"Warm It Up, Kane" (Instrumental) – 4:12

Charts

Weekly charts

References

1989 singles
Big Daddy Kane songs
1989 songs
Warner Records singles
Songs written by Big Daddy Kane
Cold Chillin' Records singles